is a Japanese TV presenter and news anchor.

He graduated from Keio University, and joined Fuji TV in 1971.

Since April 2000, he has worked on Fuji Television's Super News evening news programme alongside Yūko Andō.

See also 
 Tarō Kimura (journalist), Super News commentator

External links 
 Fuji Television caster profile 

1948 births
People from Shinagawa
Living people
Fuji News Network personalities
Japanese television personalities